Mezzana may refer to several Italian towns:

 Mezzana, Trentino a municipality in Trentino
 Mezzana Bigli in the province of Pavia
 Mezzana Mortigliengo in Piedmont
 Mezzana Rabattone in the province of Pavia
 , natural region of Corsica